Ludicrous may refer to:

Ludacris (born 1977), American rapper and actor
I, Ludicrous, English music ensemble
Ludicrous Lollipops, English band
Ludicrous: The Unvarnished Story of Tesla Motors, book about Tesla, Inc.
Ludicrous speed, after ridiculous speed and light speed, in Spaceballs
Ludicrous mode, a drag race start mode found in cars from Tesla Motors

See also